The tucan fish (Chalceus erythrurus), also called the yellowfin chalceus, is a species of freshwater fish in the family Chalceidae. It is one of five species in the genus Chalceus, and was the second species to be described therein.

Description 
The tucan fish has a pale-silver body, with bright-yellow ventral fins (hence its other common name); the rest of its fins are some mixture of yellow and red, usually with a reddish tail fin. In terms of size, it reaches 21.4 cm SL. This makes it one of the larger members of the genus Chalceus, outsized only by the pinktail chalceus.

Etymology 
The name "tucan fish" directly translates to "toucan fish", as "tucán" means toucan in Spanish. All members of the family Chalceidae are sometimes referred to as tucanfishes, but C. erythrurus is the species to which it is most often applied. 

The genus name Chalceus is Greek, and means brass or copper. The specific name erythrurus also originates in Greek, with "eruthros" meaning red and "ouros" meaning tail in reference to its caudal fin usually being reddish.

Taxonomy 
Upon being described by Edward Drinker Cope in the year 1870, the tucan fish was placed in the new genus Plethodectes with the full name Plethodectes erythrurus. However, Cope switched it over to the genus Chalceus in the year 1872.

It was briefly classified as Chalceus macrolepidotus iquitensis, a subspecies of the pinktail chalceus C. macrolepidotus, by Shoji Nakashima in 1941. Henry Watson Fowler described it as Pellegrinina heterolepis in 1907, but Jacques Géry proved it to be a member of the Chalceus genus in 1977.

The name Chalceus erythrurus was once mistakenly applied to C. macrolepidotus, and they are sometimes confused with one another. They can be told apart because of the tucan fish's bright-yellow ventral fins, as well as a few other coloration patterns.

Habitat 
The tucan fish can be found in the Amazon and Solimões rivers, and its habitat extends into Peru by way of the Ucayali river.

Diet and behavior 
Like others in the genus Chalceus, the tucan fish is primarily a carnivore, targeting aquatic invertebrates (such as insects and crustaceans). It is known to be somewhat skittish, and may jump out of the water on occasion.

References 

Chalceidae
Characiformes
Fish of South America
Taxa named by Henry Weed Fowler
Fish described in 1870